On June 23, 1984, the Chicago Cubs took on the St. Louis Cardinals in a Major League Baseball contest that saw Willie McGee hit for the cycle but Ryne Sandberg hit two home runs—in the ninth and tenth innings to propelling the Cubs to a 12–11 victory. The Cubs overcame deficits of 7–1, 9–3, and 11–9 as Sandberg hit a pair of game-tying home runs in late-inning action, both off ex-Cubs ace Bruce Sutter. NBC play-by-play announcer Bob Costas, who called the game with Tony Kubek, is remembered for saying "Do you believe it?!" when Sandberg hit the second home run. The game is known as The Sandberg Game.

Bob Dernier was the leadoff hitter and gold glove center fielder for the Cubs in 1984, while Sandberg batted second. The pair was dubbed "The Daily Double" by Cubs announcer Harry Caray.

Background
After over a dozen more subpar seasons, in 1981 the Cubs hired General Manager (GM) Dallas Green from the Philadelphia Phillies to turn around the franchise. Green had managed the 1980 Phillies to the World Series title. One of his early GM moves brought in a young Phillies minor-league third baseman (3B) named Ryne Sandberg, along with Larry Bowa for Iván DeJesús. The 1983 Cubs had finished 71–91 under Lee Elia, who was fired before the season ended by Green. Green continued the culture of change and overhauled the Cubs roster, front-office and coaching staff prior to 1984. Jim Frey was hired to manage the 1984 Cubs, along with Don Zimmer to coach third base and Billy Connors serving as pitching coach.

Green shored up the 1984 roster with a series of transactions. In December 1983 Scott Sanderson was acquired from the Montreal Expos in a three-team deal with the San Diego Padres for Carmelo Martínez. Pinch hitter Richie Hebner (.333 BA in 1984) was signed as a free-agent. During spring training, moves continued: left fielder (LF) Gary Matthews and Center fielder (CF) Bob Dernier came from Philadelphia on March 26, for Bill Campbell and a minor leaguer. Reliever Tim Stoddard (10–6 3.82, 7 saves) was acquired the same day for a minor leaguer; veteran pitcher Ferguson Jenkins was released.

The team's commitment to contend was complete when Green made a midseason deal on June 15 to shore up the starting rotation due to injuries to Rick Reuschel (5–5) and Scott Sanderson. The deal brought 1979 NL Rookie of the Year pitcher Rick Sutcliffe from the Cleveland Indians. Joe Carter (who was with the Triple-A Iowa Cubs at the time) and right fielder (RF) Mel Hall were sent to Cleveland for Sutcliffe and back-up catcher (C) Ron Hassey (.333 with Cubs in 1984). Rick Sutcliffe (5–5 with the Indians) immediately joined Sanderson (8–5 3.14), Eckersley (10–8 3.03), Steve Trout (13–7 3.41) and Dick Ruthven (6–10 5.04) in the starting rotation. Sutcliffe proceeded to go 16–1 for Cubs and capture the Cy Young Award.

The Cubs 1984 starting lineup was very strong. It consisted of LF Gary Matthews (.291 14–82 101 runs 17 SB), C Jody Davis (.256 19–94), RF Keith Moreland (.279 16–80), short stop (SS) Larry Bowa (.223 10 SB), first baseman(1B) Leon "Bull" Durham (.279 23–96 16SB), CF Dernier (.278 45 SB), 3B Ron Cey (.240 25–97), closer Lee Smith (9–7 3.65 33 saves) and the 1984 NL MVP second baseman (2B) Ryne Sandberg (.314 19–84 114 runs, 19 triples, 32 SB).

Reserve players Richie Hebner, Thad Bosley, Henry Cotto, Ron Hassey and Dave Owen produced exciting moments. The bullpen depth of Rich Bordi, George Frazier, Warren Brusstar and Dickie Noles did their job in getting the game to Smith or Stoddard.

At the top of the order, Dernier and Sandberg were exciting, aptly coined "the Daily Double" by Harry Caray. With strong defense – Dernier CF and Sandberg 2B, won the NL Gold Glove- solid pitching and clutch hitting, the Cubs were a well-balanced team. Following the "Daily Double", Matthews, Durham, Cey, Moreland and Davis gave the Cubs an order with no gaps to pitch around. Sutcliffe anchored a strong top-to-bottom rotation, and Smith was one of the top closers in the game.

The Cubs opened up the 1984 season going 12–8 in April, and were tied for first place with the New York Mets and a half-game ahead of the Philadelphia Phillies.

On May 27 against the Cincinnati Reds in Wrigley Field, third baseman Ron Cey hit what was originally ruled a home run down the left field line. Believing the ball had gone foul, Mario Soto and Reds manager Vern Rapp disputed the call, and during the argument, Soto shoved third base umpire Steve Rippley, who had made the call. After conferring, the umpires changed their decision and ruled it a foul ball, drawing a protest from the Cubs.  However, for shoving Rippley, Soto was ejected, prompting him to charge the field and attack Cubs coach Don Zimmer, which triggered a ten-minute brawl.  Four days later, National League president Chub Feeney suspended Mario Soto for five games.  This game is also notable because Soto's opponent that day was Dennis Eckersley, who would go on to become a record-setting closer years later. Eckersley, who was making his Cubs debut after being acquired in a trade with the Boston Red Sox (the Cubs traded Bill Buckner and got Eckersley and then-minor league middle infielder Mike Brumley), would take the loss that day.

The National League East race stayed tight through the first half of the season, with the Cubs and Phillies tied at 42–34 on June 30, with the Mets trailing by just one and a half games. The second half of the season was different, with the Cubs posting a 54–31 record, with the Mets trailing, and the Phillies slumping back to a .500 record.

Game
One game in particular was cited for putting twenty-four-year-old second baseman Ryne Sandberg (as well as the 1984 Cubs in general) "on the map", an NBC national telecast of a Cardinals–Cubs game on June 23, . The Cubs had been playing well throughout the season's first few months, but as a team unaccustomed to winning, they had not yet become a serious contender in the eyes of most baseball fans.

As for Sandberg, he had played two full seasons in the major leagues, and while he had shown himself to be a top-fielding second baseman and fast on the basepaths (over 30 stolen bases both seasons), his .260-ish batting average and single-digit home run production were respectable for his position but not especially noteworthy, and Sandberg was not talked about outside Chicago. And as previously alluded to, the Game of the Week, however, put the sleeper Cubs on the national stage against their regional rival, the St. Louis Cardinals. Both teams were well-established franchises with strong fan bases outside the Chicago and St. Louis areas.

The Cardinals led throughout the game, and led 9-8 going into the bottom of the ninth with closer Bruce Sutter on the mound. Willie McGee, who as previously mentioned, hit for the cycle
and had 6 RBI, was already announced as NBC's "Player of the Game." Sutter was at the forefront of the emergence of the closer in the late 1970s and early 1980s: a hard-throwing pitcher who typically came in just for the ninth inning and saved around 30 games a season. (Sutter was especially dominant in 1984, saving 45 games.) And between 1981 and 1984, Sutter saved 132 games and twice finished in third place in the Cy Young Award balloting. However, in the ninth inning, Sandberg, not yet known for his power, slugged a home run to left field  into the left-field bleachers against the Cardinals' ace closer, tying the game at nine.

Despite this dramatic act, the Cardinals scored two runs in the top of the tenth to regain the lead. Sutter stayed in the game attempting to close out the win. After the first two batters were retired, Bob Dernier walked, bringing up Sandberg again in the tenth inning, facing a determined Sutter with one man on base. He promptly hit another game-tying home run into the left-field bleachers, sending the Wrigley fans into a frenzy. As Cubs' radio announcer Harry Caray described it: 

The Cardinals did not score in the top of the 11th, but the Cubs loaded the bases on three walks, then rookie Dave Owen singled in the winning run. Ryne Sandberg had 7 RBI in the game. Henceforth, this game has become known as "The Sandberg Game". NBC later reported that McGee and Sandberg would share the "Player of the Game" honor.

Calls
As previously mentioned, Bob Costas called NBC's Game of the Week with Tony Kubek, where Ryne Sandberg hit two separate home runs in the 9th and 10th innings against Bruce Sutter to tie the game.

Costas's call of the first home run:
Into left center field, and deep. This is a tie ball game!

Costas's call of the second home run:
Costas: 1–1 pitch. [Sandberg swings] 
Kubek: OHHH BOY! 
Costas: [Over Kubek] And he hits it to deep left center! Look out! Do you believe it, it's gone! We will go to the 11th, tied at 11.

After Sandberg hit his second home run in the game (with two out in the bottom of the 9th to tie it 11–11), Costas cried "That's the real Roy Hobbs because this can't be happening! We're sitting here, and it doesn't make any difference if it's 1984 or '54-just freeze this and don't change a thing!"

Linescore

Aftermath
The Cubs ended their playoff drought on September 24 at Three Rivers Stadium in front of just over 5,000 fans, many of whom were Cubs fans. Rick Sutcliffe threw a two-hit complete game for his sixteenth straight victory, and the Cubs won the National League East.

In the NLCS, the Cubs easily won the first two games at Wrigley Field against the San Diego Padres. The Padres were the winners of the Western Division with Steve Garvey, Tony Gwynn, Eric Show, Goose Gossage and Alan Wiggins. With wins of 13–0 and 4–2, the Cubs needed to win only one game of the next three in San Diego to make it to the World Series. After being beaten in Game 3 7–1, the Cubs lost Game 4 when Smith, with the game tied 5–5, allowed a game-winning home run to Garvey in the bottom of the ninth inning. In Game 5 the Cubs took a 3–0 lead into the 6th inning, and a 3–2 lead into the seventh with Sutcliffe (who won the Cy Young Award that year) still on the mound. Then, Leon Durham had a sharp grounder go under his glove. This critical error helped the Padres win the game 6–3, with a 4-run 7th inning and keep Chicago out of the 1984 World Series against the Detroit Tigers. 

In 1984, Sandberg's runs and triples totals led the National League.

After his great season in which he garnered national attention, he wrote an autobiography Ryno with Fred Mitchell.

ESPN replayed significant portions of the game prior to Sandberg's Hall of Fame induction in 2005, which show Sutter turning and shouting "Damn!" to himself when Sandberg hit the second one. However, Sutter later credited that replaying with helping him achieve his own Hall of Fame election the following year.

See also
Cardinals–Cubs rivalry
List of events at Wrigley Field

References

External links
 St. Louis Cardinals at Chicago Cubs Box Score, June 23, 1984 on Baseball Almanac
 St. Louis Cardinals vs Chicago Cubs June 23, 1984 Box Score on Baseball-Reference.com

1984 Major League Baseball season
Chicago Cubs
St. Louis Cardinals
1984 in sports in Illinois
1980s in Chicago
June 1984 sports events in the United States
Sports competitions in Chicago
Major League Baseball games